The XXVI Fighter Command was a formation of the United States Army Air Forces.  It was assigned to Sixth Air Force throughout its existence. It was based at Albrook Field, Panama Canal Zone,  where it was inactivated on 25 August 1946. It engaged in antisubmarine operations from the Canal Zone.

In 1947, when the United States Air Force (USAF) became independent, the Army transferred all Army Air Forces, Air Service and Air Corps units (there were a number of Air Corps units that had never been in the Army Air Forces, and a few Air Service units) to the USAF. A year later, the newly forming USAF permanently disbanded the command.

Lineage
 Constituted as 26th Interceptor Command on 28 February 1942
 Activated on 6 March 1942
 Redesignated: 26th Fighter Command on 15 May 1942
 Redesignated: XXVI Fighter Command c. 18 September 1942
 Inactivated on 25 August 1946
 Disbanded on 8 October 1948

Components
 Groups
 16th Pursuit Group (later 16th Fighter Group), 6 March 1942 – 1 November 1943
 32d Fighter Group, 6 March 1942 – 1 November 1943
 37th Fighter Group, 18 September 1942 – 1 November 1943
 53d Pursuit Group (later 53d Fighter Group), 6 March – 26 November 1942

 Squadrons

 24th Fighter Squadron, 1 November 1943 – 25 August 1946
 28th Fighter Squadron, 1 November 1943 – 25 August 1946
 29th Fighter Squadron, 1 November 1943 – 8 April 1944
 30th Fighter Squadron, 1 November 1943 – 25 August 1946
 31st Fighter Squadron, 1 November 1943 – 8 April 1944
 32d Fighter Squadron, 13 March 1944 - 25 Aug 1946
 43d Fighter Squadron, 1 November 1943 – 25 August 1946
 51st Fighter Squadron, 1 November 1943 – 25 August 1946
 52d Fighter Squadron, 1 November 1943 – 8 April 1944

Stations
 Albrook Field, Panama Canal Zone, 6 March 1942 – 25 August 1946

References

Notes
 Explanatory notes

 Citations

Bibliography

 
 

26
Military units and formations disestablished in 1946